George Edward Power (16 May 1849 – 29 October 1904) was an English cricketer. Power was a right-handed batsman. He was born at Witchford, Cambridgeshire.

Power made a single first-class appearance for Nottinghamshire against Surrey at Trent Bridge in 1876. In what was an innings and 24 runs victory for Nottinghamshire, Power batted once and scored 3 runs, before being dismissed by James Southerton. This was his only major appearance for Nottinghamshire.

He died at Hucknall, Nottinghamshire on 29 October 1904.

References

External links
George Power at ESPNcricinfo
George Power at CricketArchive

1849 births
1904 deaths
People from East Cambridgeshire District
English cricketers
Nottinghamshire cricketers